Demetrius Antonio Battie (born February 11, 1976) is an American former professional basketball player. He works as an analyst for the Orlando Magic of the National Basketball Association (NBA).

High school and college career
Battie attended South Oak Cliff High School in Dallas and played college basketball for the Texas Tech Red Raiders where he ended his career as the school all-time leader in blocked shots with 162 blocks. His best season, statistically, was in his junior year when he scored 18.8 points per game, 11.8 rebounds per game, and 2.5 blocks per game.

NBA career
Battie was drafted fifth overall by the Denver Nuggets in the 1997 NBA draft, where he played one season. He was traded to Los Angeles Lakers along with Tyronn Lue for Nick Van Exel in 1998. In 1999, he was traded to the Boston Celtics for Travis Knight. He remained with the Celtics for six years before he was traded to the Cleveland Cavaliers along with Eric Williams, and Kedrick Brown in exchange for Ricky Davis, Chris Mihm, Michael Stewart, and a second-round pick. The Cavaliers traded Battie to the Orlando Magic for Drew Gooden, Steven Hunter, and the Magic's second-round draft pick, Anderson Varejão. On June 25, 2009, he was traded to the New Jersey Nets along with Rafer Alston and Courtney Lee in exchange for Vince Carter and Ryan Anderson. In July, 2010 Battie signed a contract with Philadelphia 76ers as a free agent. He would spend the last two seasons with the 76ers before announcing his retirement.

Battie was a solid role player who only became more valuable with age. As an offensive player, he lacked the skills to be an effective scorer, but he still developed an adept mid-range jump shot. Battie's worth came from his perfected offensive and defensive screens which aided in the team strategy. On the defensive side, Battie was an average rebounder and blocker. As his career progressed, Battie's veteran presence was a helpful tool to young, emerging teams like the Magic and the 76ers.

Personal life
In September 2000, Battie's then teammate, Paul Pierce, was stabbed at the Buzz Club, a late night dance club in the Boston Theater District; Battie and his brother saved Pierce by rushing him to a nearby hospital.

NBA career statistics

Regular season

|-
| align="left" | 
| align="left" | Denver
| 65 || 49 || 23.2 || .446 || .214 || .702 || 5.4 || .9 || .8 || 1.1 || 8.4
|-
| align="left" | 
| align="left" | Boston
| 50 || 15 || 22.4 || .519 || .000 || .672 || 6.0 || 1.1 || .6 || 1.4 || 6.7
|-
| align="left" | 
| align="left" | Boston
| 82 || 4 || 18.4 || .477 || .125 || .675 || 5.0 || .8 || .6 || .9 || 6.6
|-
| align="left" | 
| align="left" | Boston
| 40 || 25 || 21.1 || .537 || .000 || .638 || 5.8 || .4 || .7 || 1.5 || 6.5
|-
| align="left" | 
| align="left" | Boston
| 74 || 73 || 24.6 || .541 || .000 || .413 || 6.5 || .5 || .8 || .9 || 6.9
|-
| align="left" | 
| align="left" | Boston
| 67 || 62 || 25.1 || .539 || .200 || .746 || 6.5 || .7 || .5 || 1.2 || 7.3
|-
| align="left" | 
| align="left" | Boston
| 23 || 6 || 21.8 || .479 || 1.000 || .697 || 5.1 || .9 || .3 || .9 || 5.9
|-
| align="left" | 
| align="left" | Cleveland
| 50 || 1 || 19.5 || .427 || .125 || .768 || 4.8 || .7 || .4 || .9 || 5.4
|-
| align="left" | 
| align="left" | Orlando
| 81 || 32 || 23.4 || .460 || .000 || .723 || 5.6 || .5 || .4 || 1.0 || 4.9
|-
| align="left" | 
| align="left" | Orlando
| 82 || 82 || 27.0 || .507 || .000 || .664 || 5.6 || .6 || .6 || .8 || 7.9
|-
| align="left" | 
| align="left" | Orlando
| 66 || 66 || 23.9 || .489 || .000 || .675 || 5.2 || .5 || .4 || .5 || 6.1
|-
| align="left" | 
| align="left" | Orlando
| 77 || 3 || 15.6 || .489 || .222 || .659 || 3.6 || .4 || .3 || .3 || 4.8
|-
| align="left" | 
| align="left" | New Jersey
| 15 || 0 || 8.9 || .350 || .250 || .700 || 1.5 || .2 || .3 || .1 || 2.4
|-
| align="left" | 
| align="left" | Philadelphia
| 38 || 0 || 9.9 || .469 || .667 || .571 || 2.6 || .3 || .1 || .4 || 2.6
|-
| align="left" | 
| align="left" | Philadelphia
| 27 || 11 || 10.9 || .373 || .000 || 1.000 || 2.5 || .6 || .1 || .2 || 1.6
|-
| align="center" colspan="2" | Career 
| 837 || 429 || 21.1 || .488 || .162 || .690 || 5.1 || .6 || .5 || .9 || 6.1

Playoffs

|-
| align="left" | 2002
| align="left" | Boston
| 16 || 16 || 27.7 || .488 || .000 || .619 || 7.6 || .8 || .6 || 1.9 || 6.1
|-
| align="left" | 2003
| align="left" | Boston
| 10 || 10 || 21.3 || .564 || .000 || .500 || 4.9 || .5 || .4 || 1.4 || 6.6
|-
| align="left" | 2007
| align="left" | Orlando
| 4 || 4 || 21.8 || .389 || .000 || .250 || 4.0 || .3 || .0 || .0 || 3.8
|-
| align="left" | 2009
| align="left" | Orlando
| 21 || 0 || 6.1 || .467 || .000 || .600 || 1.0 || .1 || .0 || .1 || 2.1
|-
| align="left" | 2011
| align="left" | Philadelphia
| 5 || 0 || 7.6 || .429 || .000 || .500 || 2.0 || .0 || .0 || .6 || 1.4
|-
| align="center" colspan="2" | Career 
| 56 || 30 || 16.2 || .493 || .000 || .550 || 3.9 || .4 || .3 || .9 || 4.1

References

External links

1976 births
Living people
American men's basketball players
Basketball players from Dallas
Boston Celtics players
Centers (basketball)
Cleveland Cavaliers players
Denver Nuggets draft picks
Denver Nuggets players
New Jersey Nets players
Orlando Magic players
Philadelphia 76ers players
Power forwards (basketball)
Texas Tech Red Raiders basketball players